The Mozambican passport is issued to citizens of Mozambique for international travel. In 2016, Mozambican passport holders had visa-free or visa on arrival access to 51 countries and territories.

See also
 List of passports
 Mozambican national ID card
 Visa requirements for Mozambican citizens

References

Passports by country
Government of Mozambique